Platyclymenia is a genus of ammonites belonging to the family Platyclymeniidae.

These fast-moving nektonic carnivores lived in the Devonian period, Famennian stage (364.7 to 360.7 Ma).

Species
Species within the genus Platyclymenia include:
Platyclymenia alterna Jenkins 1968
Platyclymenia americana Raymond 1907
Platyclymenia annulata Munster 1832
Platyclymenia eurylobica Petersen 1975
Platyclymenia levata Hartenfels & Becker 2016
Platyclymenia montana Korn & Titus 2006
Platyclymenia teicherti Jenkins 1968

Description

Distribution
Fossils of species within this genus have been found in the Devonian sediments of Australia, China, Morocco, Poland and United States.

References

Late Devonian ammonites
Ammonites of Australia
Ammonites of Europe
Devonian animals of Asia
Ammonite genera
Clymeniina